Simaethula is a genus of Australian jumping spiders that was first described by Eugène Louis Simon in 1902. The name is an alteration of Simaetha, a related genus.

Species
 it contains seven species, found only in Australia:
Simaethula aurata (L. Koch, 1879) – Australia (Queensland)
Simaethula auronitens (L. Koch, 1879) – Australia (Queensland, New South Wales)
Simaethula chalcops Simon, 1909 – Australia (Western Australia)
Simaethula janthina Simon, 1902 (type) – Australia (Queensland)
Simaethula mutica Szombathy, 1915 – Australia
Simaethula opulenta (L. Koch, 1879) – Australia (Queensland, New South Wales)
Simaethula violacea (L. Koch, 1879) – Australia (Queensland)

References

Salticidae genera
Salticidae
Spiders of Australia